Karl Edward Simpson (born 14 October 1976 in Newmarket) is a former professional footballer. He was a midfielder who began his career with Norwich City before he was released by the Canaries and moved into non-league football.

Simpson was sent off on his debut for Norwich on 20 September 1995 in a Football League Cup match against Torquay at Carrow Road.

Simpson had a stint as player manager and manager at Sinjun's Grammarians in the AFC league in london.

External links
 
Career information at ex-canaries.co.uk

Sources
Canary Citizens by Mark Davage, John Eastwood, Kevin Platt, published by Jarrold Publishing, (2001), 

1976 births
Norwich City F.C. players
Living people
Association football midfielders
English footballers